Combretum multinervium is a species of flowering plant in the bushwillow genus Combretum, family Combretaceae. It is native to tropical West Africa where it grows in Liberia, Ivory Coast, Ghana, Gabon and the Democratic Republic of the Congo.

References

multinervium
Flora of West Tropical Africa
Flora of the Democratic Republic of the Congo